Stoner Creek may refer to:
Stoner Creek (Colorado), a stream in Colorado
Stoner Creek (Kentucky), a stream in Kentucky
Stoner Creek Stud, a racehorse